Voy a hablar de la esperanza is a 1966 Argentine film directed by Carlos F. Borcosque and starring Alfredo Alcón, Inda Ledesma and Raúl Rossi.

Cast
Alfredo Alcón 	
Inda Ledesma 	
Raúl Rossi 			
Carlos Borsani 	
Lydia Lamaison 	
Horacio Casals 			
Luis Manuel de la Cuesta 			
Virginia Lago

References

External links
 

1966 films
Argentine drama films
1960s Spanish-language films
Films directed by Carlos F. Borcosque
1960s Argentine films